Jeff McLean may refer to:
Jeff McLean of McLean Family (rugby footballers)
Jeff McLean (ice hockey) (born 1969), hockey player